Junghuhnia globospora is a species of poroid fungus in the family Steccherinaceae. Found in the Andes region of Venezuela, it was described as a new species in 2010 by mycologists Teresa Iturriaga and Leif Ryvarden.

References

Fungi described in 2010
Fungi of South America
Steccherinaceae
Taxa named by Leif Ryvarden